Nigilgia violacea is a moth in the family Brachodidae. It was described by Kallies and Arita in 2007. It is found in China (Guangdong).

The wingspan is 13–15 mm for males and 14.5–17 mm for females. The forewings are black with a violet lustre and with metallic golden scales at the base. The hindwings are uniform dark brown to black. Adults have been recorded feeding on the flower nectar of Patrinia species.

References

Natural History Museum Lepidoptera generic names catalog

Brachodidae
Moths described in 2007